Hamad Ndikumana (5 October 1978 – 15 November 2017) also known as Katauti by the Rwandan fans, was a Rwandan football defender who was released from APOP Kinyras Peyias FC in Cyprus. His main attribute was his excellent tackling. He died on 15 November 2017.

Career
He played also for Anorthosis, KV Mechelen, APOP Kinyras Peyias, Nea Salamina and KAA Gent. After several rows with Temuri Ketsbaia broke his contract with Anorthosis and signed for AC Omonia. On July 18 he signed a contract with AEL Limassol.

International career
He helped Rwanda reach the African Cup of Nations 2004 for the first time in its history.

References

External links
 

1978 births
2017 deaths
Rwandan footballers
Rwandan expatriate footballers
Association football defenders
APOP Kinyras FC players
Nea Salamis Famagusta FC players
Anorthosis Famagusta F.C. players
AC Omonia players
AEL Limassol players
Rwanda international footballers
2004 African Cup of Nations players
Belgian Pro League players
Cypriot First Division players
Expatriate footballers in Belgium
Expatriate footballers in Cyprus
People from Kigali
Rayon Sports F.C. players
Rwandan expatriate sportspeople in Belgium